Vasantha Geetha is a 1980 Indian Kannada-language romantic drama film, directed by the Dorai–Bhagavan duo. The film stars Rajkumar, Gayathri and Master Lohith.

The story, lyrics and screenplay were written by Chi. Udaya Shankar. The movie saw a theatrical run of 25 weeks.

A portion of the song Kannalle Eno from this movie was re-used in the title track of the 2010 movie Jackie.

Director S.K.Bhagwan had revealed that he was so impressed by an Iranian movie which he saw at an international film festival at New Delhi that he used the core plot of that movie as a reference point for the storyline of this movie.

Plot 
Vasanth, a private insurance agent, who works on commission, struggles to make a living with very little commission in his life. so he gets thrown out of his rented house. He seeks help of his close friend Srinivas Murthy’s family and stays with them. He then accidentally meets a rich businessman’s daughter Geeta, who is very arrogant and treats people like dirt. Vasanth doesn’t care about her status, gives her right replies and shows her that it’s the good will and humble nature, which people like and not her arrogance. Vasant, makes a good impression on Geeta’s dad by returning the purse of Geeta. In return Geeta’s dad, invites him to a party where Vasant makes good contacts and grows his insurance business.

Later Geeta, transforms herself and falls in love with Vasant. For which, Ashwath, father of Geeta, objects her decision. To which Geeta and Vasant, overrule and get married in a temple. And then start leading their independent life in a small house and then they will have baby, after sometime, the baby grows to be a 5 year old son, Punnet, here is playing as son’s role.

Meanwhile, Srinivas Murthy, friend of Vasant, gets severely sick and needs urgent care and help. Vasant, leaves all his work and helps Srinivas Murthy and admits him to a big hospital with specialist care. For his operation, Vasant had to take his friend and wife to Bangalore. This was seen by Geeta’s maid servant. She misinterprets it as an Extra-marital affair and says this to Geeta and Geeta’s mom. When, Vasant is busy with his office work and friend’s health check up, Geeta, confronts Vasant about his affair, unknown about this, Vasant slaps Geeta and hurriedly goes to his friend’s check up. Geeta, quits Vasant and moves to her father’s house and plans for a divorce. 

Vasant’s friend Srinivas Murthy, recovers from his heart problem and doctors asks him to take rest for 15 more days for things to be normal. Now, Vasant, returns home and realizes his wife Geeta and his Son, have left him and moved to his father in law’s house. 

Vasant, misses his son, and goes to his Son’s school and picks him up and takes away from his wife. Which is booked by Geeta’s father as Kidnapping case and they also publish his photo in newspapers. 

Srinivas Murthy, reads this on newspaper and inspite of illness, takes the car and reaches Geeta’s house and explains all the details to Geeta and her Father. 

Later, Geeta and her father realize their mistake and ask for forgiveness to Vasant, Vasant shows his good nature again forgives all for an happy ending.

Note:  Vasant’s role is played by Dr Raj Kumar And son’s role is played by Puneet Rajkumar.

Cast 

Rajkumar as Vasantha
Gayathri as Geetha (Voice dubbed by B. Jayashree)
Master Lohith as Shyam
K. S. Ashwath as Seshadri
Srinivasa Murthy as Ramu
Leelavathi as Lakshmi
Thoogudeepa Srinivas
Prabhakar

Soundtrack 
The music was composed by M. Ranga Rao, with lyrics by Chi. Udaya Shankar. All the songs composed for the film were received extremely well and considered as evergreen songs. A portion of the song Kannalle Eno from this movie was re-used in the title track of the 2010 movie Jackie.

References

External links 
 

1980 films
1980s Kannada-language films
Indian romantic drama films
Films scored by M. Ranga Rao
1980 romantic drama films
Films directed by Dorai–Bhagavan